Peponopsis is a monotypic genus of flowering plants belonging to the family Cucurbitaceae. The only species is Peponopsis adhaerens.

Its native range is Mexico.

References

Cucurbitaceae
Monotypic Cucurbitaceae genera
Taxa named by Charles Victor Naudin
Plants described in 1859